Portezuelo del Cajón, also known as Hito Cajón, is a mountain pass on the border between Chile and Bolivia, located on the lower southeast flank of Juriques volcano, close to the Licancabur volcano. The road over the pass begins at the junction with Chile Route 27, close to Cerro Toco.

The Bolivian side of the border is in the Eduardo Avaroa Andean Fauna National Reserve, close to the Laguna Verde and to the Laguna Blanca. The crossing is frequently used by tourists travelling between Uyuni and San Pedro de Atacama.

References 

Mountain passes of Chile
Mountain passes of Bolivia
Mountain passes of the Andes
Bolivia–Chile border crossings
Landforms of Antofagasta Region
Landforms of Potosí Department